Oligodon venustus, also known as Jerdon's kukri snake, is a species of snake found in the Western Ghats of India (south of Goa).

References

Further reading
 Jerdon, T.C. 1853 Catalogue of the Reptiles inhabiting the Peninsula of India. Part 2. J. Asiat. Soc. Bengal xxii: 522-534 [1853]

venustus
Snakes of Asia
Reptiles of India
Endemic fauna of the Western Ghats
Reptiles described in 1853
Taxa named by Thomas C. Jerdon